There is no official anthem which represents only Northern Ireland, a constituent country of the United Kingdom, but as it is part of the United Kingdom, the British national anthem God Save the King is used in Northern Ireland.

Two pieces of music are used to represent Northern Ireland in a sporting context:
 Londonderry Air is played as the anthem of Northern Ireland at the some events such as the Commonwealth Games. "Danny Boy" is a popular set of lyrics to the tune.
 God Save the King, the national and royal anthem of the United Kingdom, is played as the anthem of Northern Ireland at the some events such as association football.

Ireland's Call is used by the Ireland rugby union team, Ireland rugby league team, Ireland cricket team and Ireland field hockey teams. All of these teams represent the entire island of Ireland.

Amhrán na bhFiann (The Soldier's Song), the national anthem of the Republic of Ireland, is used by some organisations almost exclusively operated by Irish nationalists in the whole island of Ireland, such as the Gaelic Athletic Association.

See also
Flag of Northern Ireland

Anthems of non-sovereign states